The Willard–Clark House is a historic two-story mansion in Maryville, Tennessee, U.S.. It was built for B.F. Willard in 1886. The Willards owned the house until 1903, and it was purchased by J. L. Clark in 1905. In 1910, Clark added a portico, designed in the Classical Revival architectural style. They also the house to Elmer L. Hudson in 1929, who sold it to Granville R. Swaney in 1931. It has been listed on the National Register of Historic Places since July 25, 1989.

References

Houses completed in 1886
1886 establishments in Tennessee
Houses on the National Register of Historic Places in Tennessee
Neoclassical architecture in Tennessee
Buildings and structures in Blount County, Tennessee